The 1985 Buffalo Bulls football team represented the University at Buffalo as an independent during the 1985 NCAA Division III football season. Led by Bill Dando in his ninth season as head coach, the team compiled a record of 4–6.

Schedule

References

Buffalo
Buffalo Bulls football seasons
Buffalo Bulls football